Cameraria guttifinitella is a moth of the family Gracillariidae. It is widespread in North America.

The wingspan is about 7 mm.

The larvae feed on Toxicodendron pubescens and Toxicodendron radicans. They mine the leaves of their host plant. The mine has the form of a flat, whitish blotch mine on the upperside of the leaf. Often, two or more mines occur on a single leaf, so that, by the completion of larval development, almost the entire surface of the leaf is mined.

References

External links
mothphotographersgroup
Bug Guide
Cameraria at microleps.org

Cameraria (moth)

Moths described in 1859
Moths of North America
Lepidoptera of Canada
Leaf miners
Taxa named by James Brackenridge Clemens
Lepidoptera of the United States